Piers Plowright (30 December 1937 – 23 July 2021) was a British radio producer. Plowright was born in Hampstead, London, to Molly (née Mary Eugster) and Oliver Plowright. He attended Stowe School and then undertook national service in Malaya before returning to the UK and studying history at Christ Church, Oxford, graduating in 1962. He subsequently taught for the British Council in Borneo, Iran and Sudan. He started working for the BBC as a trainee producer in 1968 and remained there until his retirement in 1997.

Plowright was a three-times winner of the Prix Italia for radio drama and documentaries, and was also awarded three gold and two silver Sony Awards, plus the Sony Special Award for his work in radio. In 1998, he was made a fellow of the Royal Society of Literature. In his history of BBC Radio 4, Life On Air, author David Hendy described Plowright's work as "closely observed portraits gently lobbed in the listeners' direction in the hope of starting a few ripples of emotion and thought".

Plowright was married to Royal Holloway theatre academic Lim Poh Sim (Poh Sim Plowright), with whom he had three children.

References

Further reading

1937 births
2021 deaths
BBC radio producers
People educated at Stowe School
Prix Italia winners
People from Hampstead